Maya Ritter (born November 9, 1993, in Kelowna, British Columbia) is a Canadian actress.

Career 
Ritter played the lead role of Molly McIntire in the 2006 television movie Molly: An American Girl on the Home Front.
She also starred in the film Finn's Girl as Zelly in 2007. That same year she acted in Holiday Switch as Eleanor. In 2008 she acted in The Last Hit Man as the Young Raquel. Her most recent role was in The Capture of the Green River Killer as Teen Angela.

Filmography

Film

Television

References

External links

American Girl (company) An American Girl on the Home Front

1993 births
Living people
Canadian film actresses
Canadian child actresses
People from Kelowna
Actresses from British Columbia